Alexander Lloyd may refer to:

 Alexander Loyd (1805–1872),  mayor of Chicago, Illinois
 Alexander Lloyd, 2nd Baron Lloyd (1912–1985), British Conservative politician
 Alexander Lloyd (venture capitalist), venture capitalist
 Alex Lloyd (born 1974), Australian singer-songwriter
 Alex Lloyd (album)
 Alex Lloyd (racing driver) (born 1984), British motor racing driver
 Alex Loyd (1927–1976), American football end
 Alex Lloyd (rower) (born 1990), Australian Olympic rower